American Life Insurance Company Limited MetLife Nepal is a life insurance company in Nepal established in 2001. As of 16 July 2019, they have total source of NRS 18,633,007,259.

They started Insurance service in Nepal since 5 December 2001 and till now they have more than 8000 agents and 35 branches.

Services 
 Life insurance
 Health insurance
 Accident insurance
 Employee benefits Insurance

References

External links 
 
 Metlife Nepal Notices

Insurance
Insurance companies based in Nepal
2001 establishments in Nepal